The Korisliiga is the top-tier professional basketball league in Finland, comprising the top 12 teams of the country. In its current format, each team plays all other teams two times in the regular season, once at home and once away, for a total of 22 regular season games. The top six teams advances continues to upper stage and the bottom six teams plays lower stage after 22 games, 5 games at home and 5 games at away versus all other teams in stage. The best two teams from lower group joins to playoffs with upper group teams. Playoffs are played best of seven format, except the quarter-finals which are played best of 5 format. Pantterit holds the record for the most league titles won, with 14. The top level Finnish league for women is the Naisten Korisliiga.

Logos

Teams

Current teams

From 2000s, Korisliiga in timeline

Title holders 

 1938-39 Ylioppilaskoripalloilijat
 1939-40 Eiran Kisa-Veikot
 1940-41 Kadettikoulu
 1941-43 Not held due to WWII
 1943-44 Kiri-Veikot
 1944-45 Kiri-Veikot
 1945-46 NMKY Helsinki
 1946-47 NMKY Helsinki
 1947-48 Kiri-Veikot
 1948-49 HOK-Veikot
 1949-50 HOK-Veikot
 1950-51 HOK-Veikot
 1951-52 HOK-Veikot
 1952-53 Pantterit
 1953-54 Pantterit
 1954-55 Pantterit
 1955-56 Pantterit
 1956-57 Pantterit
 1957-58 KTP
 1958-59 Pantterit
 1959-60 Torpan Pojat
 1960-61 Helsingin Kisa-Toverit
 1961-62 Helsingin Kisa-Toverit
 1962-63 Helsingin Kisa-Toverit
 1963-64 Helsingin Kisa-Toverit
 1964-65 Helsingin Kisa-Toverit
 1965-66 Torpan Pojat
 1966-67 KTP
 1967-68 Espoon Honka
 1968-69 Espoon Honka
 1969-70 Espoon Honka
 1970-71 Espoon Honka
 1971-72 Espoon Honka
 1972-73 Turun NMKY
 1973-74 Espoon Honka
 1974-75 Turun NMKY
 1975-76 Espoon Honka
 1976-77 Turun NMKY
 1977-78 Torpan Pojat
 1978-79 Espoon Honka
 1979-80 Pantterit
 1980-81 Torpan Pojat
 1981-82 Turun NMKY
 1982-83 Torpan Pojat
 1983-84 NMKY Helsinki
 1984-85 NMKY Helsinki
 1985-86 Torpan Pojat
 1986-87 NMKY Helsinki
 1987-88 KTP
 1988-89 NMKY Helsinki
 1989-90 Uudenkaupungin Urheilijat
 1990-91 KTP
 1991-92 NMKY Helsinki
 1992-93 KTP
 1993-94 KTP
 1994-95 Kouvot
 1995-96 Torpan Pojat
 1996-97 Torpan Pojat
 1997-98 Torpan Pojat
 1998-99 Kouvot
 1999-00 Namika Lahti
 2000-01 Espoon Honka
 2001-02 Espoon Honka
 2002-03 Espoon Honka
 2003-04 Kouvot
 2004-05 Lappeenrannan NMKY
 2005-06 Lappeenrannan NMKY
 2006-07 Espoon Honka
 2007-08 Espoon Honka
 2008-09 Namika Lahti
 2009-10 Tampereen Pyrintö
 2010-11 Tampereen Pyrintö
 2011-12 Bisons Loimaa (Nilan)
 2012-13 Bisons Loimaa (Nilan)
 2013-14 Tampereen Pyrintö
 2014-15 Kataja
 2015-16 Kouvot
 2016-17 Kataja
 2017-18 Kauhajoki Karhu
 2018-19 Kauhajoki Karhu
 2019–20 None
 2020–21 Salon Vilpas
 2021-22 Kauhajoki Karhu

Finals

Performance by club 
Teams shown in italics are no longer in existence.

Records

All-time table of teams
Updated after the 2021-22 season.

All-time leaders 

Source: Basket.fi

Single game records

Source: Basket.fi

Individual player records 
As of after the 2021-22 season.

 Most points scored in a game: 
 79 by Joe Wright on February 12, 1992 in Turku NKMY 117-145 Panterit
 Highest efficiency score in a game
 70 by Larry Pounds on November 24, 1985 in Kotka Työväe's Ballers 100-73 Säynätsalo Riento
 Most 2-point field goals made in a game
 24 by Herbert Crook on March 11, 1993 in Helsingin NMKY 132-111 Turun NMKY
 Most 3-point field goals made in a game
 14 by Adonis Jordan on October 17, 1999 in Espoon Honka 98-84 Pussihukat
 Most free throws made in a game
 27 by Ville Kaunisto on April 12, 2004 in Kouvot 96-71 Namika Lahti
 Most rebounds in a game
 32 by Garcia Hopkins on February 16, 1986 in Tampereen Pyrintö 131-80 Säynätsalon Riento

Awards
MVP – One for domestic players and another for foreign ones.
Finals MVP
Defensive Player of the Year
Rookie of the Year
Most Improved Player
Sixth Man of the Year
Coach of the Year
Referee of the Year
Finnish Basketball Hall of Fame

Attendance

Averages

Records

See also
Finnish Basketball Cup

References

External links
 Finnish Basketball Association / Korisliiga

 
Basketball leagues in Finland
Professional sports leagues in Finland